The 2022 European Mixed Team Judo Championships was held at the Gilbert Buttazzoni Sports Palace in Mulhouse, France, on 12 November 2022.

Schedule & event videos
The event aired on the EJU YouTube channel. The draw was held on 11 November at 16:00. All times are local (UTC+1).

Results

Main draw

Repechage

References

External links
  
 

European Mixed Team Judo Championships
European Judo Championships
Team
European Championships, Team
Judo
Europe
Judo
Judo, European Championships, Team
European Judo Mixed Team Championships
Judo in France